The Battle of Glorieta Pass (March 26–28, 1862) in the northern New Mexico Territory, was the decisive battle of the New Mexico campaign during the American Civil War. Dubbed the "Gettysburg of the West"  by some authors (a term described as one that "serves the novelist better than the historian"), it was intended as the decisive blow by Confederate forces to break the Union possession of the West along the base of the Rocky Mountains. It was fought at Glorieta Pass in the Sangre de Cristo Mountains in what is now New Mexico, and was an important event in the history of the New Mexico Territory in the American Civil War.

There was a skirmish on March 26 between advance elements from each army, with the main battle occurring on March 28. Although the Confederates were able to push the Union force back through the pass, they had to retreat when their supply train was destroyed and most of their horses and mules killed or driven off. Eventually the Confederates had to withdraw entirely from the territory back into Confederate Arizona and then Texas. Glorieta Pass thus represented the climax of the campaign.

New Mexico campaign

The lower portion of the New Mexico Territory had been largely neglected by both the federal government and the territorial government in Santa Fe. As a result, Confederate sympathy was strong, in hopes of receiving better treatment by the new government. Following secession moves by residents, Confederate forces seized Mesilla and captured the federal troops there, who made a halfhearted attempt to retreat to Santa Fe. In early 1862 the Confederacy established the Confederate Arizona Territory, which included the southern halves of both modern Arizona and New Mexico. The strategic goals were to gain access to the gold and silver mines of California and the Colorado Territory and the seaports in Southern California, and thus evade the Union naval blockade.

The commanders of the New Mexico Campaign were Confederate Brig. Gen. Henry Hopkins Sibley and  Union Col. Edward Canby. Sibley attempted to capture Fort Craig, completely outmaneuvering Canby at the Battle of Valverde in February and driving him back into his fort, but failed to force Canby's surrender. Sibley then bypassed the fort and advanced north through the Rio Grande Valley, occupying Santa Fe on March 10. Canby remained at Fort Craig, hoping to cut Sibley's logistical support from Texas and awaiting reinforcements before he dared to take the offensive. Sibley made his headquarters at the abandoned Union storehouse at Albuquerque.

In March Sibley sent a Confederate force of 200–300 Texans under the command of Maj. Charles L. Pyron on an advance expedition over the Glorieta Pass, a strategic location on the Santa Fe Trail at the southern tip of the Sangre de Cristo Mountains southeast of Santa Fe. Control of the pass would allow the Confederates to advance onto the High Plains and make an assault on Fort Union, a Union stronghold on the route northward over Raton Pass. Sibley sent six companies under the command of Col. Tom Green to block the eastern end of Glorieta Pass, turning any Union defensive position in the Sangre de Cristos.

Opposing forces

Union (North)

Confederate

Battle

The Confederates were led by Charles L. Pyron and William Read Scurry. During the battle on March 26, Pyron had his battalion of the 2nd Texas Mounted Rifles, four companies of the 5th Texas Mounted Rifles under Maj. John Shropshire and two cannons. Scurry's force included nine companies of the 4th Texas Mounted Rifles under Maj. Henry Raguet, five companies of the 7th Texas Mounted Rifles under Maj. Powhatan Jordan and three additional cannons.

The Union forces were led by Col. John P. Slough of the 1st Colorado Infantry, with units under the command of Maj. John M. Chivington. In the action on March 26, Chivington had three infantry companies and one mounted company of the 1st Colorado and a detachment of the 1st and 3rd U.S. Cavalry regiments. During the main battle on the 28th, Slough commanded, in person, nine companies of the 1st Colorado, a detachment from the 1st, 2nd and 3rd U.S. Cavalry regiments and two artillery batteries. Chivington commanded five companies of the 5th U.S. Infantry, one company from the 1st Colorado, James Hobart Ford's independent company from the 2nd Colorado and some New Mexico militiamen.

Combat commenced shortly after their arrival at the battlefield, leaving them little time to recuperate.

Apache Canyon

Pyron's force of 300 camped at Apache Canyon, at one end of Glorieta Pass, leaving a picket post of 50 men at the summit of the pass. Chivington led 418 soldiers to the pass and, on the morning of March 26, moved out to attack. After noon Chivington's men captured the picket post and found the main force behind them. Chivington advanced on them, but their artillery fire threw him back. He regrouped, split his force to the two sides of the pass, caught the Confederates in a crossfire, and soon forced them to retire. The Union forces flanked Pyron's men again and punished them with enfilade fire. Pyron ordered another retreat, but the withdrawal of the artillery caused the Confederates to become disorganized and start fighting in separate clusters of men. Chivington ordered a mounted Colorado company to make a frontal charge against the artillery; this succeeded in capturing several Confederates and scattering the rest. Not knowing if Confederate reinforcements were nearby, Chivington then retired and went into camp at Kozlowski's Ranch to await Slough with the main body. His small victory was a morale boost for Slough's army.

No fighting occurred the next day, as reinforcements arrived for both sides. Scurry's troops arrived at 3:00 am on March 27, swelling the Confederate force to about 1,100 men and five cannons; as senior officer present, he took command of the entire Confederate force. Thinking that Slough would attack again and expecting Green to arrive in the Union rear at any time, Scurry chose to remain in place for the day, digging rifle pits. Slough arrived early in the morning of March 28 with about 900 more men, bringing the Union strength to 1,300.

Glorieta Pass

Both Scurry and Slough decided to attack on March 28 and set out early to do so. Expecting the Confederates to remain in Apache Canyon, Slough sent Chivington with two infantry battalions, under Lewis and Wynkoop, out in a circling movement with orders to go hide out at Glorieta Pass and hit the Texans in the flank once Slough's main force had engaged their front. Chivington did as ordered and his men waited above the pass for Slough and the enemy to arrive. However, instead of remaining at Apache Canyon as Slough had expected, Scurry advanced down the canyon more rapidly than Slough had anticipated. Scurry believed the Union force was retreating to Fort Union. He intended to attack them until Green could arrive. One cannon and a small guard was left at Johnson's Ranch, while the rest of the Confederate force—more than 1000 men—marched eastwards along the Santa Fe Trail.

A provisional battalion of four companies from the 1st Colorado, supported by both batteries, was commanded by Lt. Col. Samuel Tappan, who deployed his men across the trail. The Confederates dismounted and formed a line across the canyon, but the terrain caused some companies to become intermingled. Tappan was initially successful and held his ground for a half-hour, but the Confederates' numerical superiority enabled them to outflank Tappan's line by noon. The Union troops were thrown back in confusion but managed to take up position around the adobe ranch buildings. Slough reformed his men several hundred yards closer to Pigeon's Ranch, with the four companies under Tappan and an artillery battery on a hill to the left, the other battery supported by two companies in the center across the road and the remaining two companies on the ridge to the right.

Scurry then launched a three-pronged attack. Pyron and Raguet were ordered to attack the Union right, Shropshire the Union left, with the remainder led by Scurry against the Union center, and the artillery firing in support. The attack on the Union left was beaten back, with Shropshire killed. The attack on the center stalled, while the artillery was forced to withdraw after one cannon was disabled and a limber destroyed. The attack itself then stalled, with the Confederates fighting by squads "with a desperation unequaled by any engagement of the war." At around 3:00 pm the Confederates outflanked the Union right, but Raguet was mortally wounded. From the ridge (thereafter known as "Sharpshooters Ridge"), Confederate riflemen started picking off the artillerymen and infantry below them. Scurry again pressed the Union center, and the Union position became untenable. Slough reluctantly ordered a retreat, and Tappan formed the companies on the left into a rear guard. Slough reformed his line a half-mile east of Pigeon's Ranch, where skirmishing continued until dusk. The Union men finally retreated to Kozlowski's Ranch, leaving the Confederates in possession of the battlefield.

Johnson's Ranch
With the sounds of battle echoing in the distance, Lt. Col. Manuel Chaves of the 2nd New Mexico Infantry, commander of the New Mexican volunteers, informed Maj. Chivington that his scouts had located the Confederate supply train at Johnson's Ranch. After watching the supply train for an hour, Chivington's force descended the slope and attacked, driving off or capturing the small guard with few casualties on either side. They then looted and burned 80 supply wagons and spiked the cannon, either killing or driving off about 500 horses and mules before returning with their prisoners to Kozlowski's Ranch. With no supplies to sustain his advance, Scurry had to retreat to Santa Fe, the first step on the long road back to San Antonio, Texas. Thanks to Chaves' assistance, the Federals had turned a defeat into victory and stopped further Confederate advances in the Southwest. Glorieta Pass was the turning point of the war in the New Mexico Territory.

Parts of the Glorieta Pass Battlefield are preserved in Pecos National Historical Park and are the site of an annual NPS Civil War Encampment event  commemorating the battle.

Controversy
Many New Mexicans disputed the view that Chivington was the hero of Johnson's Ranch. Many Santa Fe residents credited James L. Collins, a Bureau of Indian Affairs official, who had suggested the roundabout attack on the supply train. Chivington had actually been sent out in hopes of making a flank attack, and the discovery of the supply train was a lucky accident. He was also accused of almost letting the opportunity slip by him. On January 23, 1864, the New Mexico Territorial Legislature adopted a resolution that did not mention Chivington and instead asked President Lincoln to promote William H. Lewis and Asa B. Carey, both regular army officers, for "distinguished service" in the battle. On March 8 the Rio Abajo Press of Albuquerque complained about "Col. Chivington's strutting about in plumage stolen from Captain William H. Lewis" (it did not mention Carey). According to the newspaper editor, "Some one of the party" suggested the attack, which Chivington only agreed to after "two hours persuasion." Furthermore, Lewis had led the attack, while Chivington was "viewing the scene from afar".

A more serious charge made against Chivington was that if he had hurried to reinforce Slough as soon as he heard gunfire coming from Pigeon's Ranch, his 400 men might have been enough to win the battle for the Federals, especially if he had attacked Scurry's flank as he had been ordered.

Aftermath

In the end, the Battle of Glorieta Pass was consequential. First, despite the fact that the Confederates took the field, they were forced to retreat to Santa Fe due to the destruction of their supplies and eventually abandon New Mexico Territory. Second, the battle at Glorieta foiled Sibley's plan to obtain his key objective: the capture of the major federal base at Fort Union. That would have broken federal resistance in New Mexico and compelled Union forces to retire north of Raton Pass and back into Colorado Territory.

In any case, the dream of a Confederate stronghold in the Southwest was impractical; New Mexico could not provide enough sustenance for any prolonged Confederate occupation. Furthermore, the approach of the Federal "California Column" eastward through the New Mexico Territory during the summer of 1862 would have seriously jeopardized Confederate control of the region.

Battlefield preservation

In 1987 two Confederate burial sites were discovered at Pigeon's Ranch. One was the solitary grave of Maj. John Samuel Shropshire, the other was a mass grave of 30 Confederates. Only Shropshire and five others could be positively identified. On August 5, 1990, Maj. Shropshire's remains were reburied next to his parents in his family's cemetery in Bourbon County, Kentucky. The remaining 30 Confederates were reinterred in the Santa Fe National Cemetery.

In 1993 the congressionally appointed Civil War Sites Advisory Commission issued its "Report on the Nation's Civil War Battlefields." The commission was tasked with identifying the nation's historically significant Civil War sites, determining their importance and providing recommendations for their preservation to Congress.

Of the roughly 10,500 actions of the U.S. Civil War, 384 (3.7%) were identified by the commission as principal battles and rated according to their significance and threat of loss. The Battle of Glorieta Pass received the highest rating from the commission, priority I (class A). Class A battlefields are principal strategic operations having a direct impact on the course of the war. With this rating the commission placed Glorieta Pass on the same level as battles such as Gettysburg and Antietam. The priority I rating identified Glorieta Pass as being not only one of the most important, but also one of the most highly endangered battlefields in the country. Only ten other battlefields received the priority I (class A) rating. The commission recommended that Congress focus its preservation efforts on priority I, nationally significant battlefields.

Since 1993 portions of the Glorieta Pass Battlefield have become a unit of the National Park Service. The Glorieta Pass unit (Pigeon's Ranch) comprises roughly 20% of the total battlefield. The remaining 80% is in private ownership. Glorieta Pass Battlefield is managed by Pecos National Historical Park and supported by the Glorieta Battlefield Coalition, a non-profit citizens' organization. The Civil War Trust (a division of the American Battlefield Trust) and its partners have acquired and preserved  of the Glorieta Pass battlefield.

The Glorieta Pass Battlefield is also designated as a National Historic Landmark.

Depictions in popular culture
The 1966 Sergio Leone film The Good, the Bad and the Ugly refers obliquely to the battle, setting one scene during the post-battle retreat of Sibley's men.

The battle is described in the 1999 historical novel Glorieta Pass by P. G. Nagle.

The events at Johnson's Ranch are depicted in Elmer Kelton's 2009 novel, Many A River, with some changes to fit them to his plot.

The journey of Scurry's Confederate and Slough's Union forces to the battleground as well as a detailed narrative of the fight are described in Tom Bensing's 2012 novel Silas Soule, A Short, Eventful Life of Moral Courage.

Notes

References
 National Park Service battle description
 The Battle of Glorieta Pass from the University of San Diego history department

Further reading
 Alberts, Don. The Battle of Glorieta: Union Victory in the West. Texas A&M University Press, 1996. .
 Scott, Robert. "Glory, Glory, Glorieta: The Gettysburg of the West." Johnson Books, 1992. .
 Simmons, Mark. "The Battle at Valley's Ranch: First account of the Gettysburg of the West, 1862." San Pedro Press, 1987. .
 Whitford, William. "Battle of Glorieta Pass: The Colorado Volunteers in the Civil War." Rio Grande Press, 1990. .

External links

 The Battle of Glorieta Pass: A Shattered Dream, a National Park Service Teaching with Historic Places (TwHP) lesson plan
 Glorieta and Raton Passes: Gateways to the Southwest, a National Park Service Teaching with Historic Places (TwHP) lesson plan
 On this date in Civil War history – Battle of Glorieta Pass 

Glorieta Pass
Glorieta Pass
Glorieta Pass
1862 in New Mexico Territory
Glorieta Pass
History of Santa Fe County, New Mexico
History of San Miguel County, New Mexico
Sangre de Cristo Mountains
American frontier
March 1862 events